The Canadian Junior Open is a yearly Junior squash championship held in Niagara-on-the-Lake, Ontario, Canada. The tournament hosts nearly 300 players representing between 20 and 25 countries every year. The tournament is organized by Squash Canada and Squash Ontario.

The Canadian Junior Open is divided into eight categories — Boys Under-19, Boys Under-17, Boys Under-15, Boys Under-13, Girls Under-19, Girls Under-17, Girls Under-15 and Girls Under-13.

List of winners by category (Boys)

Boys' champions by country

List of winners by category (Girls)

Girls' champions by country

See also
 World Junior Squash Circuit
 World Junior Squash Championships
 British Junior Open Squash
 Dutch Junior Open Squash
 US Junior Open squash championship
 European Squash Federation
 French Squash Federation

References

External links
French Junior Open history
French Junior Open SquashSite website

Squash tournaments in France
Squash records and statistics
Youth sport in France